Dipaenae salcedo is a moth of the subfamily Arctiinae first described by Paul Dognin in 1898. It is found in Panama and Ecuador.

References

Lithosiini